The Command for Hunting Communists (Portuguese: Comando de Caça aos Comunistas, CCC) was a paramilitary anti-communist group active in Brazil during the first years of the military dictatorship (1964–1985).

Activities

The CCC, in the mid-1960s, began as an informal organization of rightist university students who allegedly monitored leftist students, or anyone they deemed as a communist. It was also composed by police officers and intellectuals favorable to the military regime.

When the military regime took place, the Rádio MEC, a state-owned broadcasting station in Rio de Janeiro, was invaded and destroyed by members of the CCC. The CCC was also held responsible for the arsoning, on the same day, of the Rio headquarters of the National Union of Students (União Nacional dos Estudantes, UNE, in Portuguese), an organization usually deemed left-leaning by right-leaning individuals and groups.

The CCC was also involved in the events known as Conflito da Rua Maria Antônia ("Maria Antônia street skirmish") in 1968, among students of the Mackenzie University and University of São Paulo, Brazil's leading public university — where a student died.

As a paramilitary group, the CCC became known to the general public when it staged attacks on leftist personalities outside the university milieu. What most provoked considerable public remarks was the invasion of the Ruth Escobar Theatre in São Paulo on July 18, 1968, where they beat the cast members of Chico Buarque's play Roda Viva. Among them was actress Marília Pêra, who was hit with rubber truncheons and had to flee naked into the street, alongside other members of the female cast. According to the same source, the CCC was also responsible for a bomb attack on the Opinião Theatre in Rio de Janeiro on December 2 of the same year and for kidnapping, torturing and murdering of Antônio Henrique Pereira Neto, a Catholic priest of Recife and aide of archbishop Helder Câmara, on May 26, 1969.

Military backing and demise
As the military government, at the end of 1968, dissolved habeas corpus and could arrest citizens without the right of defense,  Brazilian repressive institutions such as the DOI-CODI holding the power of life and death over anyone deemed an enemy of the military regime, paramilitary groups such as CCC lost their raison d' étre and ceased their actions, its individual members quietly melding into the social support basis for the dictatorship.

See also
 ABIN (Agência Brasileira de Inteligência) - Present Brazilian Intelligence Agency
 DOI-CODI (Destacamento de Operações de Informações - Centro de Operações de Defesa Interna) - Brazilian Intelligence Agency during Military Dictatorship

References

Anti-communism in Brazil
Paramilitary organisations based in Brazil
Far-right politics in Brazil